Ziegfeld Girl is a 1941 American musical film directed by Robert Z. Leonard and starring James Stewart, Judy Garland, Hedy Lamarr, Lana Turner, Tony Martin, Jackie Cooper, Eve Arden, and Philip Dorn. The film, which features musical numbers by Busby Berkeley, was produced by Metro-Goldwyn-Mayer.

Set in the 1920s, the film tells the parallel stories of three women who become performers in the renowned Broadway show the Ziegfeld Follies. It was intended to be a 1938 sequel to the 1936 hit The Great Ziegfeld, and recycled some footage from the earlier film.  Unlike that film and the later Ziegfeld Follies, Ziegfeld himself does not appear as a character.

Plot
As happens every year, Florenz Ziegfeld is seeking new talent for the latest edition of his lavish Broadway revue, the Ziegfeld Follies. Three women, Sandra Kolter, Susan Gallagher, and Sheila Regan are among those selected to join the cast of glamorous "Ziegfeld girls", and become friends.

Sandra, a European beauty, is spotted and recruited while accompanying her violin virtuoso husband Franz to his audition for the show's orchestra. Franz is rejected because his musical skills are too good for the job, and Sandra becomes a showgirl over Franz' objections in order to earn needed income, causing a rift between the couple. Sandra quickly becomes a star and attracts the attentions of her singing co-star, Frank Merton. But after learning that Frank is married to a wife who loves him, Sandra reconciles with Franz and abandons her career to support him on a concert tour.

Susan, a seventeen-year-old from a theatrical family, is discovered performing a vaudeville act with her aging father. Although Susan is less physically beautiful than the other showgirls, her enormous singing talent lands her a featured role. Her father, not wanting to thwart her career, encourages her to stay in the Follies while he continues traveling on the vaudeville circuit alone. Susan worries about her father and eventually convinces the producers to give him a part in the show, where he proves to be a surprise hit.

Sheila, a former elevator operator from Flatbush, Brooklyn, is torn between her love for truck driver Gil Young and her suddenly wealthy life as a showgirl, including a Park Avenue apartment, press coverage, and expensive gifts from rich male fans. After she turns down Gil's marriage proposal, he joins a bootlegging gang and ends up in prison. Sheila becomes an alcoholic and is fired from the show after a drunken fall onstage. Seriously ill and unable to sustain her luxurious lifestyle, she moves back into her family's modest Flatbush home. Gil, newly released from prison, visits her and pledges his love, although he knows she is dying. Despite her precarious health, Sheila goes alone to the opening night of the latest Follies show, where she collapses in the theater. Sandra and Franz rush to her side as Susan, now a star, sings from the stage.

Cast

Musical numbers 

 "Overture" – played by Orchestra and sung by Chorus
 "Laugh? I Thought I'd Split My Sides" (music and lyrics by Roger Edens) – sung and danced by Judy Garland and Charles Winninger
 "You Stepped Out of a Dream" (music by Nacio Herb Brown, lyrics by Gus Kahn) – sung by Tony Martin and Chorus
 "I'm Always Chasing Rainbows" (music by Harry Carroll, lyrics by Joseph McCarthy) – sung by Judy Garland
 "Caribbean Love Song" (music by Edens, lyrics by Ralph Freed) – sung by Tony Martin and Chorus
 "Minnie from Trinidad" (Edens) – sung by Chorus and danced by Antonio and Rosario, then sung and danced by Judy Garland and Chorus
 "Mr. Gallagher and Mr. Shean" – performed by Charles Winninger and Al Shean
 "Ziegfeld Girls/You Gotta Pull Strings" (Edens) – sung by Judy Garland and Chorus
 "You Stepped Out of a Dream (reprise)" – sung by Tony Martin
 "You Never Looked So Beautiful" (music by Walter Donaldson, lyrics by Harold Adamson) – sung by Judy Garland and Chorus

Deleted song
A musical number sung by Garland, "We Must Have Music", was deleted from the final film. Only a fragment survives, as it was used in the MGM short A New Romance of Celluloid: We Must Have Music (1942).

Box office

According to MGM records, the film earned $1,891,000 in the US and Canada and $1,210,000 elsewhere resulting in a profit of $532,000.

Accolades
The film is recognized by American Film Institute in these lists:
 2006: AFI's Greatest Movie Musicals – Nominated

References

External links
 
 
 
 
 

1941 films
1941 musical films
American black-and-white films
American musical films
1940s English-language films
Films about musical theatre
Films directed by Robert Z. Leonard
Films produced by Pandro S. Berman
Films scored by Herbert Stothart
Films set in Florida
Films set in New York City
Films with screenplays by Sonya Levien
Metro-Goldwyn-Mayer films
Ziegfeld Follies
1940s American films